Koh e Qaim is a mosque located in Hyderabad, India. It is dedicated to the last of The Twelve Imams of Shia Islam, Muḥammad ibn al-ḤHasan al-Askari.

Mosques in Hyderabad, India
Shia Islam